The John E. G. Povey House in northeast Portland, Oregon, is a Queen Anne-style house that was built in 1891. It was home of glass-maker John E. G. Povey (1867–1917).

It was listed on the National Register of Historic Places in 1998.
It was deemed significant for its association with John E. G. Povey and the Povey Brothers Art & Stained
Glass Works company, and also for its architecture "containing high artistic merit both in the craftsmanship of the structure and the stained glass designs in many of the windows."

The Povey Brothers Art Glass Works firm was founded by John E. and brother David L. Povey in Portland in 1888;  it was the leading art-glass maker in the area from about 1890 to about 1920.

John E. G. Povey died in the house in 1917, at age 49.

See also
 National Register of Historic Places listings in Northeast Portland, Oregon

References

1891 establishments in Oregon
Houses completed in 1891
Multnomah County, Oregon
Houses on the National Register of Historic Places in Portland, Oregon
Queen Anne architecture in Oregon
Irvington, Portland, Oregon